The voiceless or more precisely tenuis lateral click is a click consonant found primarily among the languages of southern Africa.

Features
Features of the tenuis lateral click:

Occurrence
Tenuis lateral clicks are found primarily in the various Khoisan language families of southern Africa and in some neighboring Bantu languages.

References

Click consonants
Lateral consonants
Oral consonants
Tenuis consonants